Chlorotalpa is a genus of mammal in the family Chrysochloridae. It contains the following species:

 Duthie's golden mole (Chlorotalpa duthieae)
 Sclater's golden mole (Chlorotalpa sclateri)

References

Afrosoricida
Mammal genera
Taxonomy articles created by Polbot